Sebastian Ernst Klaus Dietz (born 25 February 1985) is a German track and field athlete who competes in disability athletics in the F36 category. Dietz specializes in both the discus and shot put, winning a gold medal in the former at the 2012 Summer Paralympics in London. As well as achieving Paralympic success Dietz has also won gold in his classification in both discus and shot put at the IPC World Championships.

References

External links
 
 

1985 births
Living people
German male discus throwers
German male shot putters
World record holders in Paralympic athletics
Paralympic athletes of Germany
Paralympic gold medalists for Germany
Paralympic bronze medalists for Germany
Paralympic medalists in athletics (track and field)
Athletes (track and field) at the 2012 Summer Paralympics
Athletes (track and field) at the 2020 Summer Paralympics
Medalists at the 2012 Summer Paralympics
Medalists at the 2020 Summer Paralympics
Track and field athletes with disabilities
People from Worms, Germany
Sportspeople from Rhineland-Palatinate